The 1998 United States Senate election in New Hampshire was held on November 3, 1998. Incumbent Republican U.S. Senator Judd Gregg won re-election to his second term.

Major candidates

Democratic 
 George Condodemetraky, engineer and Army veteran

Republican 
 Judd Gregg, incumbent U.S. Senator

Results

See also 
 1998 United States Senate elections

References 

United States Senate
New Hampshire
1998